Milton Marks, Jr. (July 22, 1920 – December 4, 1998) was an American politician who served in the California State Assembly and California State Senate, as both a Republican and a Democrat, representing San Francisco for 38 years.

Early life 
Born in San Francisco, Marks attended the city's Alamo Grammar School and Galileo High School, where he participated in the Junior Reserve Officers' Training Corps. After graduating from Galileo as valedictorian of the class of 1937, Marks went on to earn an A.B. from Stanford University in 1941, where he had been part of the Army Reserve Officers' Training Corps. Marks went on to the UC Berkeley School of Law and was studying with a friend, future federal judge Milton Lewis Schwartz, at International House Berkeley during the attack on Pearl Harbor.

Less than a month after the attack, Marks reported to Fort Ord as a second lieutenant in the United States Army. Serving in the Pacific Theater of Operations, including the Philippines Campaign (1944–45), he was the Assistant Defense Counsel for the Court of the Eighth United States Army during the Occupation of Japan. After completing his Army service as a Major, Marks returned to the UC Berkeley Law School but eventually transferred, graduating from San Francisco Law School in 1949.

Political career 
Marks first ran unsuccessfully for the State Assembly in 1954 as a Republican. He was elected in 1958 as a Republican to the Assembly, serving until 1966, when he was named a city judge. When a vacancy occurred in a State Senate seat in 1967, he ran in and won the special election as a Republican, defeating Democrat Assemblyman John L. Burton, who was the younger brother of powerful Democratic Congressman Phil Burton, head of the San Francisco political machine. While still a Republican, Marks made an unsuccessful run for Congress in 1982 to unseat Phil Burton, losing by a margin of 58%-40%. Burton died unexpectedly of an aneurysm five months after the election at the age of 56 and was succeeded by Sala Burton, who would serve in the seat until her death less than four years later when she was succeeded by Nancy Pelosi, a longtime Burton family friend.

He served in the Senate as a Republican until 1988, when he won re-election as a Democrat. He won his last Senate term as a Democrat in 1992; term limits forced his retirement in 1996.

Personal life 
Marks and his wife, Carolene, had three children: the late Milton Marks III, who served as a board member of City College of San Francisco, Caro Marks, a Federal Defender in Sacramento, and Edward David Marks, an attorney practicing in the Bay Area.

References

External links
Join California Milton Marks

1920 births
1998 deaths
Politicians from San Francisco
Stanford University alumni
United States Army personnel of World War II
Military personnel from California
Members of the California State Assembly
California state senators
California Republicans
California Democrats
San Francisco Law School alumni
20th-century American politicians